is a Japanese international rugby union player who plays in the lock position.

Early / Provincial Career

Kotaki has played all of his senior club rugby in Japan with the Toshiba Brave Lupus who he joined in 2015.

Super Rugby Career

Kotaki was selected as a member of the first ever Sunwolves squad ahead of the 2016 Super Rugby season.   He played 3 matches in their debut campaign.

International

Kotaki made his senior international debut for Japan in a match against South Korea on April 30, 2016 and also featured as a starter in all 3 of his country's tests during the 2016 mid-year rugby union internationals series.

Super Rugby Statistics

References

1992 births
Living people
Japanese rugby union players
Japan international rugby union players
Rugby union locks
Toshiba Brave Lupus Tokyo players
Sunwolves players
Sportspeople from Kagoshima Prefecture
Kobelco Kobe Steelers players